Diana Dymchenko (born 8 September 1989 in Oleshky, Kherson Oblast) is a Ukrainian rower. She won bronze medal at the 2018 European Championships in Glasgow, United Kingdom. 

Diana was part of the national team of Ukraine first, and later became part of the Azerbaijan national team. She represented Azerbaijan and has finished 2nd in A-Finals of the 2022 World Rowing Coastal Championships held in Saundersfoot, Pembrokeshire, Wales and won Silver medal. Diana represented  Azerbaijan in the 2022 European Rowing Coastal and Beach Sprint Championships held in San Sebastián, Spain and won Gold medal in the Women`s Single Sculls after timing 22:56.72.

External links

References 

1989 births
Living people
Ukrainian female rowers
Sportspeople from Kherson Oblast
European Rowing Championships medalists
Azerbaijani female rowers